Chorditis is the inflammation of vocal cords (vocal folds) usually as a result of voice abuse but sometimes because of cancer.

Types
 Chorditis fibrinosa
 Chorditis nodosa
 Chorditis tuberosa

See also
 Vocal fold nodule

References

External links 

Vocal fold disorders